Willie Pietersen (born 1937) is an international businessman, author, and professor at Columbia University.

William Gerard Pietersen was born in East London, South Africa, on Sept. 24, 1937 to Willem Gerhardus DuPlessis Pietersen and Hester Jacomina Francina (née Müller).  He is six feet, four inches tall and of Dutch, German and French ancestry.  Pietersen attended Rhodes University in Grahamstown, South Africa, where he earned a BA in law and economics and an LLB in law and was chairman of the Students Representative Council. He was awarded a Rhodes Scholarship to Oxford University in England where he received an MA in jurisprudence. After practicing law, he embarked on an international business career. By 1974, at age 36, Pietersen had become one of the youngest Managing Directors in the history of Unilever. Over a period of twenty years he served as the CEO of multibillion-dollar businesses such as Lever Foods, Seagram USA, Tropicana and Sterling Winthrop's Consumer Health Group.

Pietersen has served as a director on several boards including the Institute for the Future (IFTF), a think tank based in Silicon Valley.

In 1998, Willie was named Professor of the Practice of Management at the Columbia University Graduate School of Business. He specializes in strategy and the leadership of change, and his methods and ideas, especially Strategic Learning, are widely applied within Columbia's executive education programs, and also in numerous corporations.
He has served as a teacher and advisor to many global companies, including American Express, Aviva plc, Bausch & Lomb, Boeing, CNA Financial Corp., Chubb Corp., Deloitte, DePuy, Electrolux, Ericsson, ExxonMobil, Federal Home Loan Bank of Atlanta, Henry Schein Inc., Johnson & Johnson, Novartis, Pandora (jewelry), SAP AG, UGI Corp., United Nations Federal Credit Union, Univation Technologies and also the Girl Scouts of the USA.

Willie is the author of two books:
Reinventing Strategy, published in 2002, introduced the underlying principles and application tools for Strategic Learning.

Strategic Learning, March 2010, builds on these ideas and more extensive practical guidelines.

Articles about business strategy by Willie have appeared in the award-winning journal Leader to Leader, Financial Times, The European Business Review, and Columbia Business School's Ideas and Insights.

References

External links
 Website
 Coaching on Call
 Blog Talk Radio
 Who Is Michael Price
Innovative Watch
 Parliament Speakers
 The Free Library
 Direct Speakers
 NY Times article 1
 Ny Times article 2
 NY Times article 3
 NY Times article 4

Living people
1937 births
Afrikaner people
South African people of German descent
South African people of Dutch descent
South African expatriates in the United States
People from East London, Eastern Cape
South African Rhodes Scholars
South African academics
Columbia University faculty